Ta'zieh means comfort, condolence, or expression of grief. It comes from roots aza (عزو and عزى) which means mourning.

Depending on the region, time, occasion, religion, etc. the word can signify different cultural meanings and practices:
In Iranian cultural reference it is categorized as Condolence Theater or Passion Play inspired by a historical and religious event, the tragic death of Hussein, symbolizing epic spirit and resistance.
In South Asia and in the Caribbean it refers specifically to the Miniature Mausoleums (imitations of the mausoleums of Karbala, generally made of colored paper and bamboo) used in ritual processions held in the month of Muharram.
Ta'zieh, primarily known from the Iranian tradition, is a Shia Islam ritual that reenacts the death of Hussein (the Islamic prophet Muhammad's grandson) and his male children and companions in a brutal massacre on the plains of Karbala, Iraq in the year 680 AD. His death was the result of a power struggle in the decision of control of the Muslim community (called the caliph) after the death of Muhammad.

Today, we know of 250 ta'zieh pieces. They were collected by an Italian ambassador to Iran, Cherulli, and added to a collection that can be found in the Vatican Library. Ta'zieh play texts were translated from Persian into French, by Aleksander Chodźko, the Polish orientalist, into Ukrainian by Ahatanhel Krymsky, Ukrainian orientalist, and into German by Davud Monshizadeh, Iranian Orientalist. Various other scripts can be found scattered throughout Iran.

The origins 

Ta'zieh as a kind of passion play is a kind of comprehensive indigenous form considered as being the national form of Iranian theatre which have pervasive influence in the Iranian works of drama and play. It originates from some famous mythologies and rites such as Mithraism, Sug-e-Siavush (Mourning for Siavush) and Yadegar-e-Zariran or Memorial of Zarir. The ta'zieh tradition originated in Iran in the late 17th century. Mourning for Siavosh as reflected in literature is a manifestation of all the prominent characteristics of our Islamic Shabihkhani. "Some believe that Iman Hossein's tragedy as depicted in Taziah is the next recreation of the legend of Siavosh"

There are two branches of Islam; the Sunni and the Shi'i. The Sunnis make up about 85-90% of Muslims, but the ta'zieh tradition is performed by Shia Muslims during the first month of the Muslim calendar, Muharram, one of the four sacred months of the Islam calendar. The ta'zieh is performed each year on the 10th day of Muharram, a historically significant day for the Shia Muslims because that was the day of Hussein's slaughter.  Each year the same story is told, so the spectators know the story very well and know what to expect. However, this does not negatively affect audience levels. In fact, the Ta'zieh welcomes large crowds and the audience members are known to cry each time the story is told in mourning and respect for Hussein.

A strong belief in the Muslim community was that nothing created by regular people could be better than the way Allah created it, so all other creation was deemed disrespectful. Because of this, there are not many accounts-visually or otherwise- of this religious tradition. During the tradition it was very important that all spectators knew the actors were not disrespecting Allah, so most often, the actors had their scripts on stage with them so it was clear that they were not trying to depict another person that Allah did not create. The ritual was eventually banned by the authorities in Iran because the ritual was being exploited for political advances. Ta'zieh is not performed regularly in Iran and has not been seen at all in certain provinces of the region since 1920. France was the first non-Muslim country that ta'zieh was performed in 1991. Since then, the tradition has been seen in non-Iranian cities like Avignon and Paris in France, Parma and Rome in Italy, and New York City.

In Iranian culture
In Iranian culture it refers to condolence theater and Naqqali which are traditional Persian theatrical genres in which the drama is conveyed wholly or predominantly through music and singing. It dates from before the Islamic era and the tragedy of Saiawush in Shahnameh is one of the best examples.

In Iranian tradition, ta'zieh and parde-khani, inspired by historical and religious events, symbolize epic spirit and resistance. The common themes are heroic tales of love and sacrifice and of resistance against the evil.

While in the West the two major genres of drama have been comedy and tragedy, in Iran, ta'zieh seems to be the dominant genre. Considered as Iranian opera, ta'zieh resembles European opera in many respects.

Iranian cinema and Iranian symphonic music have been influenced by the long tradition of ta'zieh in Iran. Abbas Kiarostami, the noted film maker, held a series of three live ta'zieh plays in Rome in 2002. Kiarostami also made a documentary movie titled, "A Look to Ta'zieh" in which he explores the relationship of the audience to this theatrical form. Film director, Nasser Taghvaee also made a documentary on titled, "Tamrin e Akhar". Parviz Jahed created the analytical documentary film, "Ta’zieh: Another Narration" (2000), which explores the historical, mythical and ritual  roots of Ta'zieh and its most significant elements are discussed by theater experts and theoreticians such as Bahram Beyzai, Jaber Anasoori, Peter Chelkowski and Laleh Taghian. Jahed's film uses comparative analysis of Ta’zieh and the modern art of theater and the place of Ta’zieh in the Iranian contemporary theater.

The appearance of the characteristic dramatic form of Persia known as the ta'zïye Mu'izz ad-Dawla, the king of Buyid dynasty, in 963. As soon as the Safavid dynasty was established in Persia in 1501 and the Shiism of the Twelvers adopted as the official sect, the state took interest in theater as a tool of propagating Shiism.

The development of ta'ziyeh reached its peak during the Qajar period thanks, in particular, to the great interest shown by the Qajar Kings, especially Nasser al-Din Shah (1848-1896). A most important development during this period is that "due to popular demand," performances of ta'ziyeh were no longer restricted to the month of Muharram and the following month of Safar, but extended to other times throughout the year. In the beginning, there were only certain dates in the Shiite calendar when ta'ziyeh could be performed. For example, the ta'ziyeh of the martyrdom of Ali, the first Shiite Imam and the fourth caliph, was performed on the 21st of Ramadan, the day Ali died from a sword wound. Popular appreciation of this dramatic form encouraged the growth of the ta'ziyeh repertory. Other stories from the Islamic tradition as well as biblical stories and Iranian national legends were incorporated. Since staging a performance involved a great deal of effort, a ta'ziyeh group would usually perform in the same place for several days, mixing the Muharram repertory with what we can call the fringe ta'ziyeh plays. Among these plays, we finally come across comedies, or more accurately, satires, concerning various perceived enemies of the Shiites. In particular, these satires concentrated on Umar, Uthman, and Abu Bakr, the three caliphs who, according to popular Shiite belief, were instrumental in preventing Ali from becoming the first caliph/Imam after the death of Prophet Muhammad.

Guriz or flashbacks in Ta'zieh 
It is theoretically possible to incorporate any event, from the day of creation to the day of judgment, into the repertory of ta'ziyeh. This is possible through a very important theatrical device that played a crucial role in facilitating the importation of subjects foreign to the main topic into the ta'ziyeh plays without creating any technical or moral problems: guriz. The word guriz is the verbal noun of gurikhtan, which means, "to flee." In ta'ziyeh this word, combined with the aux-iliary verb zadan, acquired a very specific meaning: "to refer to the events of Kar-bala." In English "guriz zadan", could be replaced by "flashback" or "flash forward," as the case may be. The authors of ta'ziyeh plays, by utilizing guriz, created an opening for the introduction of non-Shiite plays into the ta'ziyeh repertory. They simply employed this theatrical technique as a digression: in the secular ta'ziyeh there is usually a glance at one of the events of Karbala, often toward the end of the play, but this varies depending on the action of the play. The device of guriz provided a valid pretext for producers to use stories other than the Shiite martyrdom tragedies to entertain people. Through the guriz, all human conditions are directly or indirectly related to the suffering and tragic death of the "Martyrs of Karbala," regardless of whether the story takes place before or after the Karbala massacre. The Cerulli collection, housed in the Vatican library, contains some 1,05,o5 ta'ziyeh manuscripts collected by the Italian Ambassador, Enrico Cerulli, between the years 195o and 1955. These five mnuscripts are (I) The Majles-e Amir Teymour, (2) The Dervish of the Desert, (3) Mansar Halldj, Shams-e Tabriz and Mulla of Ram, (4) The Majles-e Shahanshah- Iran, Nasser al-Din Shah, and (5) Majles of Tax Collection by Muinolbu. These manuscripts shed a light on the process by which Ta'ziyeh gradually branched off into a would-be secular theatre.

Decline of Ta'zieh plays In Iran 

The decline of ta'ziyeh began in response to the interference and opposition of several elements and forces. To begin with, during the last years of the Qajar rule, although ta'ziyeh never lost its popularity, the support of the court and the well-to-do started to wane, causing the ta'ziyeh performers to seek sponsorship from a lower strata of the society. 'After Nasser al-Din Shah, the glory and the importance of ta'ziyeh was gradually diminished but its popularity was conserved. The professional troupes which were newly formed toured the cities all year round and performed".
The rural population did not enjoy the sophistication (or perhaps the decadence) of the more advanced urban society. They were definitely more interested in the traditional ta'ziyeh and had no interest in comical developments in their yearly mourning ritual.

Women in Ta'zieh 
Women were not considered active members of the Ta'zieh performance ritual. Almost all women in these rituals were played by young males, however on some occasions little girls under the age of nine were able to fulfill small roles. Women were traditionally played by males who would wear all black and veil their faces. During the festival period, the tekyehs were lavishly decorated by the women of the community that the performance took place, with the prized personal possessions of the local community. Refreshments were prepared by women and served to the spectators by the children of well-off families. Society women were invited to watch the performance from the boxes above the general viewing area. Generally the audience consisted of the more well-off families as they regarded Ta'zieh as entertainment, while the lower-class community members thought of it as an important religious ritual. The Ta'Zieh gained popularity during the 19th century and women painted scenes from Ta'Zieh performances on the stage on canvases and recorded history. This was a huge step in the history of islamic art.

Importance of the space 
In Iranian Ta'zieh, the space is very important. Originally, Ta'zieh dramas, like other Western passion plays, were performed in a public arena, allowing large audiences to convene. They later moved to smaller spaces like courtyards and spaces within the homes of private citizens, but eventually ended up being performed in temporarily constructed performance spaces called tekyehs or husseiniyehs. The most famous tekyeh is called the Tekyeh Dowlat. It was built by the King of Iran, Naser al-Din Shah Qajar and was situated in the capital of Iran, Tehran. Tekyehs (with the exception of the Tekyeh Dowlat) were almost always constructed for temporary use and then demolished at the end of Muharram. The Tekyeh Dowlat was a permanent space built in 1868, but was torn down 79 years later in 1947 due to lack of use and replaced by a bank. Its capacity was 4,000. They varied in size fitting anywhere between a dozen to thousands of spectators. Tekyehs were somewhat open-air, but almost always had awnings of sorts atop the building to shield the spectators and actors from sun and rain. All performers in a Ta'zieh ceremony never leave the stage. The stage is elevated between one and two feet from the ground and split into four areas: one for the protagonists, antagonists, smaller subplots, and props.

Unlike most other theater traditions, especially Western theater traditions, the Ta'zieh stage and its use of props were minimalist and stark. All tekyehs are designed so that the Ta'zieh performance happens in-the-round to create a more intense experience between the actors and the audience. This enabled spectators to feel like they were part of the action on stage and sometimes encouraged them to become physically active members of the performance; it was also not unusual for combat scenes to occur behind the audience.

Costumes and character distinctions 
Costumes for a Ta'zieh ritual are what is considered representational in terms of theater. They are not meant to present reality. The main goal of the costume design was not to be historically accurate, but to help the audience recognize which type of character they were looking at. Villains were the Sunni opponents of Imam Hussein. They are always dressed in red. The protagonists, family members of Hussein, were dressed in green if they were male characters. Anyone about to die was in white. Women were always portrayed by men in all black. One way to distinguish character besides the color of their costume is how they deliver their lines. The protagonists or family of Imam Hussein sing or chant their lines and the villains will declaim their lines. If a person is traveling in a circle on or around the stage, that meant they were going a long distance (usually represented the distance between Mecca and Karbala). Traveling in a straight line represented a shorter distance traveled.

Animals in the tradition 
Often animals were used in the performance of a Ta'zieh. Often performers of Ta'zieh were on horseback. Most men from the time they were young would train to be able to ride a horse because it was an honor in Persian culture to be part of the Ta'zieh, especially to play a character who rode horseback. There were often other animals used in the tradition as well. These other animals were: camels, sheep or sometimes even a lion. Usually the lion is not real, and is just represented by a man wearing a  mask of some sort.

Ta'zīya in South Asia

Shia Muslims take out a Ta'zieh (locally spelled as Ta'zīya, Tazia, Tabut or Taboot) procession on day of Ashura in South Asia.

The artwork is a colorfully painted bamboo and paper mausoleum. This ritual procession is also observed by south Asian Muslims throughout present-day India, Pakistan and Bangladesh as well as in countries with large historical South Asian diaspora communities established during the 19th century by indentured labourers to British, Dutch and French colonies. Notable regions outside of South Asia where such processions are performed include: 
 British Guiana and Dutch Surinam ( now Guyana and Suriname)
 Fiji 
 Trinidad and Tobago 
Jamaica 
In the Caribbean it is known as Tadjah and was brought by Shia Muslim who arrived there as indentured labourers from the Indian subcontinent.

Since 1790 in Mauritius the practice is known as Ghoon Festival or Yamsé. A group of believers celebrate the 10th day of Muharram and first month of the Islamic calendar in Plaine Verte within the capital city Port Louis Mauritius.

Tabuik made from bamboo, rattan and paper is a local manifestation of the Remembrance of Muharram among the Minangkabau people in the coastal regions of West Sumatra, Indonesia, particularly in the city of Pariaman culminates with practice of throwing a tabuik into the sea has taken place every year in Pariaman on the 10th of Muharram since 1831 when it was introduced to the region by Shia Muslim sepoy troops from India who were stationed and later settled there during the British Raj.

During the colonial-era in British India, the ta'zieh (ta'zīya) tradition was not only practiced by Shia Muslims and other Muslims but joined by Hindus. Along with occasions for Shia Muslims and Hindus to participate in the procession together, the Tazia procession have also been historic occasions for communal conflicts between Sunni and Shia Muslims and between Hindu and Muslim communities since the 18th century, most notably the Muharram Rebellion which took place in Sylhet and was the first ever anti-British rebellion in the Indian subcontinent. Also in the Sylhet region, a riot took place between the Muslim and Hindu communities, even though Sylhet's Faujdar Ganar Khan tried to prevent it from forming, due to Tazia coinciding with a Hindu chariot procession. These Tazia processions have traditionally walked through streets of a town, with mourning, flagellation and wailing, ultimately to a local lake, river or ocean where all the Tazia would be immersed into water.

Gallery

See also

Hosay
Islam in Iran
Tekyeh
Muharram

Notes

References

Further reading
 Aleksander Chodźko, Théâtre persan, choix de Téaziés ou drames traduits pour la première fois de persan par A. Chodźko, Paris 1878.
 Ahatanhel Krymsky, Pers’kyj teatr, Kyjiw, 1925.
 Davoud Monchi-Zadeh, Taʿziya : Das persische Passionsspiel, mit teilweiser Übersetzung der von Litten gesammelten Stücke, Stockholm: Skrifter utgivna av K. Humanistiska Vetenskapssamfundet I Uppsala, 1967

External links

Passion play an article by Encyclopædia Britannica online
The passion (ta¿zia) of Husayn ibn 'Ali by Peter Chelkowski, an article of Encyclopædia Iranica.
Nasser Taghvaee's documentary: Tamrin e Akhar (BBC Persian)
Abbas Kiarostami on Tazieh (BBC Persian)
Ta'zieh, the Persian Passion Play
Ta'zia by Peter Chelkowski in Encyclopædia Iranica
Combining creed with culture
 The Legality of making figurine effigy (Taziyah) of the shrine
 https://www.era.lib.ed.ac.uk/bitstream/handle/1842/7362/381673.
 

Ashura
Theatrical genres
Cinema of Iran
Persian music
Cultural depictions of Husayn ibn Ali
Intangible Cultural Heritage of Humanity
Iranian inventions